William Atheling Dale (March 29, 1917 – May 4, 2010) was a Canadian athlete who competed in the 1938 British Empire Games.

Dale was born in Morse, Saskatchewan. At the 1938 Empire Games he was a member of the Canadian relay team that won the gold medal in the 4×440 yards event. He won the bronze medal in the 880 yards competition.

External links
commonwealthgames.com results
Bill Dale's obituary

Canadian male sprinters
Canadian male middle-distance runners
Athletes (track and field) at the 1938 British Empire Games
Commonwealth Games gold medallists for Canada
Commonwealth Games bronze medallists for Canada
Commonwealth Games medallists in athletics
Sportspeople from Saskatchewan
People from Morse, Saskatchewan
1917 births
2010 deaths
Medallists at the 1938 British Empire Games